The West Freeway Church of Christ shooting took place on December 29, 2019, in White Settlement, Texas, in the United States. Two people in the congregation were killed before the gunman was fatally shot by 71-year-old Jack Wilson, a volunteer security team member. The attack was live-streamed, as are all services at the church.  Video of the shooting appeared online in real time, and was captured, leading to multiple Twitter posts and YouTube videos showing the actual crime in progress.

Shooting 

The perpetrator shot and killed two members of the church before he was fatally shot by Jack Wilson, the head of the church's armed security department, ending the attack within six seconds. The victims were Anton Wallace, age 64, and Richard White, age 67. Wilson is a firearms instructor and a former reserve deputy sheriff in Hood County, Texas.

The perpetrator, wearing a fake beard and a hat, briefly spoke to Anton Wallace before drawing a shotgun and leveling it. Upon the perpetrator drawing his shotgun, churchgoer Richard White and Jack Wilson both drew their pistols. However, as they were drawing their pistols, the perpetrator opened fire, killing White with a single shot before immediately turning and firing his second shot at Wallace, killing him. The perpetrator then turned to his left, presumably to open fire on the crowd; however, he was shot and killed by Wilson. 

Wilson indicated that five or six other members of the church assembly also drew their own weapons in response to the shooting.

Perpetrator 
 
The gunman was identified as 43-year old Keith Thomas Kinnunen, of River Oaks, Texas. He was wearing a fake beard and a wig and immediately raised the suspicions of the security deacons serving the church.

Reaction
Given that an armed church member shot and killed the attacker with the church member's concealed firearm, preventing the attack from continuing and more lives being taken, gun-rights advocates used the shooting as an example of the benefits of private citizens carrying firearms.

Then Presidential candidate at the time Michael Bloomberg responded to the shooting by saying that only law enforcement officers should be allowed to carry guns and make decisions on when to shoot active shooters, generating controversy.

See also 
 Daingerfield church shooting
 Sutherland Springs church shooting
 List of shootings in Texas
 Crime in Texas
 Live streaming crime

References 

2019 crimes in Texas
2019 murders in the United States
Attacks in the United States in 2019
Attacks on churches in North America
Deaths by firearm in Texas
December 2019 crimes in the United States
Filmed killings
Livestreamed crimes
Murder in Texas
Tarrant County, Texas
2019 active shooter incidents in the United States
Defensive gun use